Shioiri Station is the name of multiple train stations in Japan.

 Shioiri Station (Kagawa) - (塩入駅) in Kagawa Prefecture
 Shioiri Station (Kanagawa) - (汐入駅) in Kanagawa Prefecture